Marilyn Stoughton Lewis (July 19, 1931 – December 7, 2020) was an American politician who served as a Republican member of the Pennsylvania House of Representatives from 1979 to 1982.

She is the widow of Andrew L. Lewis Jr., a businessman who was the 1974 Republican gubernatorial nominee and the United States Secretary of Transportation from 1981 to 1983 in the administration of U.S. President Ronald W. Reagan.

Lewis graduated from Norristown High School in Norristown, Pennsylvania. She went to Harcum College and the University of Miami. She died on December 7, 2020, at age 89 in Lansdale, Pennsylvania.

References

1931 births
2020 deaths
Republican Party members of the Pennsylvania House of Representatives
Women state legislators in Pennsylvania
Politicians from Philadelphia
Harcum College alumni
University of Miami alumni
21st-century American women